Rigging comprises the system of ropes, cables and chains, which support a sailing ship or sail boat's masts—standing rigging, including shrouds and stays—and which adjust the position of the vessel's sails and spars to which they are attached—the running rigging, including halyards, braces, sheets and vangs.

Etymology
According to the Encyclopædia Britannica Eleventh Edition "rigging" derives from Anglo-Saxon wrigan or wringing, "to clothe". The same source points out that "rigging" a sailing vessel refers to putting all the components in place to allow it to function, including the masts, spars, sails and the rigging.

Types of rigging
Rigging is divided into two classes, standing, which supports the mast (and bowsprit), and running, which controls the orientation of the sails and their degree of reefing. Configurations differ for each type of rigging, between fore-and-aft rigged vessels and square-rigged vessels.

Standing

Standing rigging is cordage which is fixed in position. Standing rigging is almost always between a mast and the deck, using tension to hold the mast firmly in place. Due to its role, standing rigging is now most commonly made of steel cable.  It was historically made of the same materials as running rigging, only coated in tar for added strength and protection from the elements.

Fore-and-aft rigged vessels

Most fore-and-aft rigged vessels have the following types of standing rigging: 
a forestay, a backstay, and upper and lower shrouds (side stays).
Less common rigging configurations are diamond stays and jumpers. Both of these are used to keep a thin mast in column especially under the load of a large down wind sail or in strong wind.
Rigging parts include swageless terminals, swage terminals, shackle toggle terminals and fail-safe wire rigging insulators.

Square-rigged vessels

Whereas 20th-century square-rigged vessels were constructed of steel with steel standing rigging, prior vessels used wood masts with hemp-fiber standing rigging. As rigs became taller by the end of the 19th century, masts relied more heavily on successive spars, stepped one atop the other to form the whole, from bottom to top: the lower mast, top mast, and topgallant mast. This construction relies heavily on support by a complex array of stays and shrouds. Each stay in either the fore-and-aft or athwartships direction has a corresponding one in the opposite direction providing counter-tension. Fore-and-aft the system of tensioning start with the stays that are anchored in front of each mast. Shrouds are tensioned by pairs of deadeyes, circular blocks that have the large-diameter line run around them, whilst multiple holes allow smaller line—lanyards—to pass multiple times between the two and thereby allow tensioning of the shroud. In addition to overlapping the mast below, the top mast and topgallant mast are supported laterally by shrouds that pass around either a platform, called a "top", or cross-wise beams, called "crosstrees". Each additional mast segment is supported fore and aft by a series of stays that lead forward. These lines are countered in tension by backstays, which are secured along the sides of the vessel behind the shrouds.

Running

Running rigging is the cordage used to control the shape and position of the sails. Materials have evolved from the use of Manilla rope to synthetic fibers, which include dacron, nylon and kevlar. Running rigging varies between fore-and-aft rigged vessels and square-rigged vessels. They have common functions between them for supporting, shaping and orienting sails, which employ different mechanisms. For supporting sails,  halyards (sometimes haulyards), are used to raise sails and control luff tension. On gaff-rigged vessels, topping lifts hold the yards across the top of the sail aloft. Sail shape is usually controlled by lines that pull at the corners of the sail, including the outhaul at the clew and the downhaul at the tack on fore-and-aft rigs. The orientation of sails to the wind is controlled primarily by sheets, but also by braces, which position the yard arms with respect to the wind on square-rigged vessels.

See also
 Full-rigged ship
 Bermuda rig
 Lateen rig
 Junk rig 
 Shipbuilding
 Superstructure

References

Further reading

External links 

Photos of different types of ship rigging
Sail Ship Rigging, at GlobalSecurity.org

Sailing rigs and rigging
Marine occupations